is a Japanese actress.

Kanjiya dropped out from Otsuma Women's University.

Filmography

TV series

Films

Dubbing
Journey to the West: Conquering the Demons, Duan (Shu Qi)
Journey to the West: The Demons Strike Back, Duan (Shu Qi)

Awards

References

External links
 
 

1985 births
Living people
Japanese television actresses
Japanese film actresses
21st-century Japanese actresses
Actresses from Tokyo
Asadora lead actors